Jaelon Darden (born January 14, 1999) is an American football wide receiver for the Cleveland Browns of the National Football League (NFL). He played college football at North Texas. He was drafted by the Tampa Bay Buccaneers in the fourth round of the 2021 NFL Draft.

Early years
Darden attended Eisenhower High School in Houston, Texas. He earned all-district honors as a quarterback in 2015. He was considered a 3-star wide receiver coming out of high school. He committed to the University of North Texas to play college football on February 1, 2017.

College career
Darden played at North Texas from 2017 to 2020. During his career he had a school record 230 receptions for 2,782 yards and 38 touchdowns. As a senior in 2020, he was the Conference USA MVP and was named an All-American by ESPN and USA Today after recording 74 receptions for 1,190 yards and 19 touchdowns. He was also a finalist for the Earl Campbell Tyler Rose Award.

College Statistics

Professional career

Tampa Bay Buccaneers
Darden was drafted by the Tampa Bay Buccaneers in the fourth round, 129th overall, of the 2021 NFL Draft. He signed his four-year rookie contract with Tampa Bay on May 19, 2021. He was waived on December 6, 2022.

Cleveland Browns
Darden was claimed off waivers by the Cleveland Browns on December 7, 2022.

References

External links
Tampa Bay Buccaneers bio
North Texas Mean Green bio

1999 births
Living people
21st-century African-American sportspeople
Players of American football from Houston
American football wide receivers
North Texas Mean Green football players
African-American players of American football
All-American college football players
Tampa Bay Buccaneers players
Cleveland Browns players